The following is a list of Michigan State Historic Sites in Marquette County, Michigan. Sites marked with a dagger (†) are also listed on the National Register of Historic Places in Marquette County, Michigan.


Current listings

See also
 National Register of Historic Places listings in Marquette County, Michigan

Sources
 Historic Sites Online – Marquette County. Michigan State Housing Developmental Authority. Accessed May 17, 2011.

References

Marquette County
State Historic Sites
Buildings and structures in Marquette County, Michigan